Kurt Schöbel (31 October 1896 – 27 December 1966) was a German sports shooter. He competed in the trap event at the 1952 Summer Olympics.

References

1896 births
1966 deaths
German male sport shooters
Olympic shooters of Germany
Shooters at the 1952 Summer Olympics